Nancy Andrews may refer to:

 Nancy Andrews (actress) (1920–1989), American stage and film actress
 Nancy Andrews (biologist) (born 1958), American biologist
 Nancy Lee Andrews (born 1947), American photographer